The breadbasket of a country or of a region is an area which, because of the richness of the soil and/or advantageous climate, produces large quantities of wheat or other grain. Rice bowl is a similar term used to refer to Southeast Asia; and California's Salinas Valley is sometimes referred to as America’s salad bowl. Such regions may be the subject of fierce political disputes, which may even escalate into full military conflicts.

Breadbaskets have become important within the global food system by concentrating global food-production in a small number of countries and, in countries such as India, in small geographic regions. As climate change increases weather variability around the world, the likelihood of multiple breadbaskets failing at a time increases dramatically. The 2022 food crises has been in part facilitated by a series of failures in key breadbasket regions, and the 2022 Russian invasion of Ukraine has created significant potential disruption of the respective breadbasket regions that are important for global wheat and oil seed production.

History

Classical antiquity
Sicily and Africa were considered the breadbaskets of the Roman Republic. Later on, Egypt was considered the breadbasket of the Roman Empire. Crimea was the source of a huge quantity of grain supplied to Greek city-states, especially Athens. Similarly in both India and China, each empire had a significant source of grain concentrated in certain geographies. The fall of the Roman Empire was in part precipitated by a decline in safe grain trade from Egypt.

Africa

In South Africa, the Free State province is often considered the country's breadbasket due to its wheat, sunflower, and maize fields. The Overberg region in the Western Cape is also known as the breadbasket of South Africa due to its large wheat fields, as well as fruit growing.

Zimbabwe, formerly known as Rhodesia, was  known as the breadbasket of Africa until 2000, exporting wheat, tobacco, and corn to the wider world, especially to other African nations. However today, Zimbabwe, is a net importer of foodstuffs from the Western World.
There seems to be more of a debate if Zimbabwe was the bread basket of Africa, as over a 55-year period Zimbabwe never topped a 10% share of maize on the continent. From 1960 to 1980 it only hit 6% lower than Kenya's contribution and on par with Nigeria.

Morocco
Since subsistence agriculture was the dominant economic system in most of Morocco's history, it's difficult to speak of a breadbasket region. All regions produced their own wheat and barley to feed themselves and their livestock. With the European commercial penetration in the second half of the 19th century, Morocco started to export wheat to Europe despite the objection of the ulama (religious establishment). The Chaouia and Doukkala plains became the most important suppliers of wheat for export. This is logical given their proximity to the coast. The ports of Casablanca and Feddala, today's Mohammedia, serviced the Chaouia Plain while the port of Mazagan serviced Doukkala.

After Morocco's independence, agriculture in Doukkala became geared toward irrigation so less area has been devoted to wheat, whereas Chaouia maintained its status as a major wheat-producing region thanks to its dark soil called tirs and relatively abundant rainfall (avg. 400 mm/year).

Asia

Europe

The Americas

North America

In Canada, a major grain-growing area is called the Canadian prairies. Sometimes the province of Saskatchewan, also known for producing a huge supplement of potash, is further singled out from within this region as the main breadbasket of Canada.

In the United States, an important region is the Corn Belt, where maize and soybeans are major crops, which generally extends from the Great Lakes south through Missouri. Further to the west in both the United States and Canada, east of the Rocky Mountains, is the Wheat Belt, where the climate is too severe for maize or soybeans.

The Palouse region of Eastern Washington state is often referred to as the Breadbasket of the Pacific Northwest, due to its high production of cereal wheat and lentils.

During the Civil War, the Shenandoah Valley was known as the Breadbasket of the Confederacy.

Additionally, the San Joaquin Valley in California has also been called the breadbasket of the world. The San Joaquin Valley produces the majority of the 12.8% of the United States' agricultural production (as measured by dollar value) that comes from California. Grapes—table, raisin, and, to a lesser extent, wine—are perhaps the valley's highest-profile product, but equally (if not more) important are cotton, nuts (especially almonds and pistachios), citrus, and vegetables. 70% of the world's and 100% of the U.S. supply of almonds comes from the valley. Oranges, peaches, garlic, tangerines, tomatoes, kiwis, hay, alfalfa and numerous other crops have been harvested with great success. According to the 2002 Census of Agriculture's ranking of market value of agricultural products sold, nine of the nation's top 10, and 12 of the top 20, producing counties are in California.

South America 

During the 19th and 20th centuries, Argentina was known as the breadbasket of the world, due to the importance that agriculture had, and still has, in the country. Argentina's cereal cultivation is found in the Pampas region, which encompasses the provinces of Buenos Aires, Santa Fe, Córdoba and La Pampa. Within this region, many cities, such as Pergamino, Venado Tuerto and Rosario, are one of the most fertile areas in the continent. Some of the plantations include soybeans, maize, wheat, barley, sunflower and peanut, among others.

In the 19th century, access to the Californian and Australian markets made wheat export a very lucrative activity, leading to the Chilean wheat cycle. In the mid-19th century, those countries experienced large gold rushes, which created a large demand for wheat. Chile was at the time the "only wheat producer of some importance in the Pacific".

Brazil is also seen as a breadbasket, as it is the world's largest supplier of coffee and contains vast tracts of arable land.

Oceania

Australia
The Murray-Darling Basin is seen as Australia's breadbasket, being the source of 40% of the nation's agricultural income, a third of the wheat harvest, 95 percent of the rice crop and other products such as fruit, wine and cotton.

New Zealand
When New Zealand became a British colony, the fertile lands produced food that would be shipped back to England, causing New Zealand to become colloquially known (occasionally along with Australia) as Britain's breadbasket, subsequently leading to the Dunedin being the first ship to complete a truly successful transport of refrigerated meat. She was refitted with a refrigeration machine with which she took the first load of frozen meat from New Zealand to the United Kingdom.

References

Further reading

 Myanmar Business Today; Print Edition, 27 February 2014. A Roadmap to Building Myanmar into the Food Basket of Asia, by David DuByne & Hishamuddin Koh

Agricultural terminology